Goran Kostić (born 18 November 1971) is a Serbian actor based in the United Kingdom. He has appeared in supporting roles in a number of Hollywood films.

Early life
Kostić was born on 18 November 1971 to an ethnic Serb family in Sarajevo, Socialist Republic of Bosnia and Herzegovina, Yugoslavia.

Career
He is an actor and producer, known for roles in Taken (2008), and Hannibal Rising (2007).

In 2007, he played the Polish builder Erek in the BBC soap opera EastEnders. He appears as Pavel, a Russian PhD student moonlighting as the campus security officer in New Tricks Series 7, episode 2, "It Smells of Books".

He appeared in Angelina Jolie's 2011 film In the Land of Blood and Honey about the Bosnian war where he plays Danijel, a Serb policeman, with co-star, Zana Marjanović. The film was Jolie's directorial debut.

Filmography

References

External links

1971 births
Bosnia and Herzegovina male film actors
Living people
Serbs of Bosnia and Herzegovina